Olotinskaya is a rural locality (a village) in Morozovskoye Rural Settlement, Verkhovazhsky District, Vologda Oblast, Russia. The population was 11 as of 2002.

Geography 
Olotinskaya is located 27 km northwest of Verkhovazhye (the district's administrative centre) by road. Fominskaya is the nearest rural locality.

References 

Rural localities in Verkhovazhsky District